"A Solid Bond in Your Heart" is a song by English band the Style Council, released as a single in 1983. It was written by lead singer Paul Weller. The song reached No. 11 on the UK Singles Chart. Weller wrote the song in 1982 while a member of the Jam, with whom he recorded a demo version which was released in 1992 on Extras, a Jam compilation album. It had been earmarked to be the Jam's final single until the band decided to release "Beat Surrender".

References

1982 songs
1983 singles
The Jam songs
The Style Council songs
Songs written by Paul Weller
Polydor Records singles